The Stambolov Bridge (Stambolovya most) is a bridge in the town of Veliko Tarnovo, Bulgaria.

Belgian, Italian, Bulgarian specialists and Bulgarian workers took part in the construction. On May 24, 1932, the legendary Bulgarian pilot Petko Popganchev passes by DAR 7 plane under the bridge without crashing. This caused a real sensation in the town.

References

Bridges in Bulgaria
Footbridges